Eric James Manlow (born April 7, 1975) is a former professional ice hockey player who played 37 games in the National Hockey League (NHL) with the Boston Bruins and New York Islanders.

Playing career 
Manlow grew up in Stirling, Ontario in his early years and played several seasons for the Stirling Blues "CC" of the OMHA's Eastern Ontario League.  When he elevated to Bantam hockey, Manlow played AAA for the Peterborough Minor Petes before being drafted by the Kitchener Rangers in the 3rd round (38th overall) of the 1991 OHL Priority Selection.

He was a member of the 1994-95 OHL Champion Detroit Jr. Red Wings and participated in the 1995 Memorial Cup Finals.

Manlow played four years in the OHL with both Kitchener and the Detroit Junior Red Wings.  He was a 2nd round draft pick (50th overall) by the Chicago Blackhawks in the 1993 NHL Entry Draft. He played for a number of minor-league teams—the Indianapolis Ice and the Long Beach Ice Dogs of the IHL, the Columbus Chill and the Florida Everblades of the ECHL, the Baltimore Bandits and the Providence Bruins of the AHL—before making his NHL debut with Boston. He bounced between the NHL and the AHL for the next 4 seasons, playing for the Bridgeport Sound Tigers and Grand Rapids Griffins in addition to New York, before spending 4 seasons in the AHL with Grand Rapids and the Hamilton Bulldogs, with whom he won the Calder Cup in 2007.

Manlow is now a constable for the Niagara Region police and lives in Niagara Falls, Ontario.

Career statistics

Awards and honours

References

External links

1975 births
Living people
Canadian ice hockey left wingers
Baltimore Bandits players
Boston Bruins players
Bridgeport Sound Tigers players
Chicago Blackhawks draft picks
Columbus Chill players
Detroit Junior Red Wings players
Florida Everblades players
Grand Rapids Griffins players
Hamilton Bulldogs (AHL) players
Ice hockey people from Ontario
Indianapolis Ice players
Kitchener Rangers players
Long Beach Ice Dogs (IHL) players
New York Islanders players
Providence Bruins players
Sportspeople from Belleville, Ontario